The Never Ending Tour is the popular name for Bob Dylan's endless touring schedule since June 7, 1988.

Background
The Never Ending Tour 1995 started in early March in the Czech Republic. The tour moved on to Germany, the Netherlands, France and Belgium. Dylan performed a large number of concerts in the United Kingdom performing three concerts in London, three in Manchester, two in Edinburgh, one in Glasgow, one in Birmingham, one in Cardiff, one in Brighton as well as one concert in Belfast. The tour finished the following day in Dublin.

Just under a month later Dylan returned to the United States to perform a twenty-nine concert tour including three performances in Los Angeles, California and three concerts in Seattle, Washington.

Dylan returned to Europe four days later to perform nineteen concerts. Dylan performed seven concerts in Germany, six concerts in Spain as well as performing at the Roskilde Festival.

At the end of September Dylan kicked off another leg of the 1995 Never Ending Tour starting in Fort Lauderdale, Florida. The tour came to an end on November 11 in Paradise, Nevada. Dylan continued to tour North America in small club venues into late December. The Never Ending Tour 1995 came to an end on December 17 in Philadelphia, Pennsylvania after one-hundred and sixteen shows.

Tour dates

Notes

References

External links
BobLinks – Comprehensive log of concerts and set lists
Bjorner's Still on the Road – Information on recording sessions and performances

Bob Dylan concert tours
1995 concert tours